Cutinite is a liptinite maceral formed from terrestrial plant cuticles, and often found in coal deposits. It is classified as a Type II kerogen.

References

Coal
Petrology

Cutinite is a coal maceral of Liptinite group of Macerals derived from waxy outer coating of leaves, roots, and stems. Cutinite is Hydrogen rich and it fluoresces under UV light. 

Reference: https://web.archive.org/web/20110720044325/http://mccoy.lib.siu.edu/projects/crelling2/atlas/macerals/mactut.html